Marefield is a hamlet and civil parish in the Harborough district of Leicestershire, England.  According to the 2001 census it had a population of 20. At the census 2011 the population remained less than 100 and is included in the civil parish of Owston and Newbold.  It was also the birthplace of Wire drummer Robert Gotobed, and Thomas Hooker, one of the main founders of Connecticut, USA.

Hamlets in Leicestershire
Civil parishes in Harborough District